Long Play or LP is a vinyl record format.

Long Play or Longplay may also refer to:

 Long Play Album by Stars on 45 (1981)
 Longplay Album – Volume II by Stars on 45 (1981)
 The Long Play, studio album by Sandra (1985)
 Long play (VCR format)
 Longplay (album), by Plavi orkestar in 1998
 Longplay (video games), a complete and detailed play-through of a video game

See also
Long Plays 83–87, compilation album by Pseudo Echo
Long Player (album) by Faces (1971)
Longplayer, music composition by Jem Finer expected to last 1,000 years
LP (disambiguation)
Extended play (disambiguation)